Raymond John Heindorf (August 25, 1908 – February 3, 1980) was an American composer and songwriter who was noted for his work in film.

Early life
Born in Haverstraw, New York, Heindorf worked as a pianist in a movie house in Mechanicville in his early teens. In 1928, he moved to New York City, where he worked as a musical arranger before heading to Hollywood. He gained his first job as an orchestrator at MGM, where he worked on Hollywood Revue of 1929, and subsequently went on the road playing piano for Lupe Vélez.

Hollywood Years
After completing this engagement, he joined Warner Bros., composing and/or arranging and conducting music exclusively for the studio for nearly forty years. Heindorf, along with Georgie Stoll at MGM, were jazz aficionados well known in the black entertainment community for employing minority musicians in their studio music departments.

He undertook the musical direction of Judy Garland's comeback film A Star is Born (1954) and made a cameo appearance as himself in the premiere party sequence where Jack Carson's character congratulates him on a great score.

Among Heindorf's other screen credits are 42nd Street, Gold Diggers of 1935, The Great Lie, Knute Rockne All American, Kings Row, Night and Day, Tea for Two, A Streetcar Named Desire, The Jazz Singer, Calamity Jane, No Time for Sergeants, The Helen Morgan Story, The Music Man, Marjorie Morningstar, Damn Yankees, Auntie Mame, Finian's Rainbow, and his final musical for Jack L. Warner, 1776.

Academy Awards
Between 1943 and 1969, he was nominated for eighteen Academy Awards, 17 nominations for Best Score and 1 nomination for Best Song. Heindorf won three, in the category of Best Score of a Musical, for Yankee Doodle Dandy, This is the Army, and The Music Man.  His wins for the former two films made him the first to accomplish consecutive wins in a musical category.

Jazz Recordings
Heindorf was a friend and admirer of jazz pianist Art Tatum. For their mutual friends, he hosted two Tatum piano performances at his Hollywood home in 1950 and 1955. Heindorf recorded these private concerts, which were issued as Art Tatum: 20th Century Piano Genius on the Verve label.

Personal life
Census records from 1930 show that Heindorf lived with bandleader and composer Arthur Lange in the Hollywood Hills.

Heindorf died in Tarzana, California, aged 71, and reputedly was buried with his favorite conducting baton.

Heindorf's son, Michael, was also a film composer.

References

External links

 

1908 births
1980 deaths
20th-century American composers
20th-century American conductors (music)
20th-century American male musicians
20th-century American pianists
American film score composers
American male composers
American male conductors (music)
American male pianists
American music arrangers
American television composers
Best Original Music Score Academy Award winners
Burials at San Fernando Mission Cemetery
Classical musicians from New York (state)
People from Greater Los Angeles
People from Haverstraw, New York
RCA Victor artists
Songwriters from New York (state)
Warner Bros. people
Warner Records artists
American male songwriters